The Cabinet of Three Counts (German - Drei-Grafen-Kabinett) was an unofficial triumvirate which dominated the politics of the Kingdom of Prussia from 1702 to 1710.  

It was made up of Alexander Hermann, Count of Wartensleben, 
August David zu Sayn-Wittgenstein-Hohenstein and Johann Kasimir Kolbe von Wartenberg.  It was also known as "the three Ws" or "the three Woes" of Prussia (Wartenberg, Wittgenstein, Wartensleben).

Sources
Samuel Buchholz: Versuch einer Geschichte der Churmark Brandenburg, Vierter Teil: neue Geschichte, Berlin 1767, Seiten 350-353 
Werner Schmidt: Friedrich I. - Kurfürst von Brandenburg König in Preußen, Heinrich Hugendubel Verlag, München 2004 
PreußenJahrBuch - Ein Almanach, MD-Berlin, Berlin 2000 
Günter Barudio: Weltgeschichte - Das Zeitalter des Absolutismus und der Aufklärung 1648-1779, Band 25, Weltbild Verlag, Augsburg 1998,  
Gustav Adolf Harald Stenzel: Geschichte des Preussischen Staats, Dritter Teil, Verlag Friedrich Perthes, Hamburg 1841

External links
www.preussenchronik.de

Kingdom of Prussia
1700s in Prussia
Politics of Prussia